The 2022–23 Copa del Rey is the 121st staging of the Copa del Rey (including two seasons where two rival editions were played), the oldest official football competition in Spain. The winners of the competition will automatically qualify for the 2023–24 UEFA Europa League group stage, and both the winners and runners-up will qualify for the 2023–24 Supercopa de España.

Real Betis were the defending champions, having beaten Valencia on penalties in the previous edition's final. They were eliminated in the round of 16 by Osasuna.

As across Spain, match times up to 30 October 2022 and from 26 March 2023 are CEST (UTC+2). Times on interim ("winter") days are CET (UTC+1). Matches played in the Canary Islands used the WET (UTC±00:00).

Schedule and format
In the summer of 2022, the RFEF released the calendar of the competition and confirmed the format of the previous season would remain.

Notes
Games ending in a draw are decided in extra time and, if still level, by a penalty shoot-out.

Qualified teams
The following teams qualified for the competition. Reserve teams are not allowed to enter.

Notes

Preliminary round

Draw
Teams were divided into four groups according to geographical criteria.

Matches

Notes

First round
The first round was played by 110 of the 115 qualified teams, with the exceptions being the four participants of the 2022–23 Supercopa de España and Primera RFEF champions. The ten winners from the previous preliminary round were paired with ten teams from La Liga. The four Copa Federación semi-finalists were drawn with the other four teams from La Liga, and the last two La Liga teams were drawn with the teams from the Tercera RFEF. The last five teams from the Tercera RFEF were paired with five teams from the Segunda División. The last fifteen teams from Segunda División were paired with fifteen teams from the Segunda RFEF. Finally, the nineteen teams from the Segunda RFEF were paired with the nineteen teams from the Primera RFEF.

A total of 55 games were played on 12 and 13 November 2022.

Draw
The draw was held on 24 October 2022. Teams were divided into seven pots.

Matches

Notes

Second round

Draw
The draw was held on 16 November 2022 in the RFEF headquarters in Las Rozas. The Primera RFEF champions entered in this round. Teams were divided into five pots according to their division in the 2022–23 season. Matches were played at the stadiums of lower-ranked teams. A total of 28 games were played from 20 to 22 December 2022.

Matches

Notes

Round of 32

Draw
The draw was held on 23 December 2022 in the RFEF headquarters in Las Rozas. The four participant teams of the 2022–23 Supercopa de España were drawn with the teams from the lowest category. The remaining teams from the lowest categories faced the rest of La Liga teams. Matches were played at stadiums of lower-ranked teams. A total of 16 games were played from 3 to 5 January 2023.

Matches

Notes

Round of 16

Draw 
The draw was held on 7 January 2023 in the RFEF headquarters in Las Rozas. The qualified teams were split up into three groups based on their division in the 2022–23 season. When possible, matches were played at the stadiums of the lower-ranked teams, otherwise the first team drawn played at home. A total of eight games were played from 17 to 19 January 2023.

Matches

Quarter-finals

Draw
The draw was held on 20 January 2023 in the RFEF headquarters in Las Rozas. As there were no teams from the lower divisions, home teams were determined by luck of the draw.

Matches

Semi-finals

Draw
The draw for the semi-finals was held on 30 January 2023 in the RFEF headquarters in Las Rozas.

Summary

|}

Matches

Final

Top scorers

References

External links
Royal Spanish Football Federation official website
Copa del Rey at LFP website

2022-23
1